The Chase is the fourth studio album by American country music artist Garth Brooks. It was released on September 14, 1992, through Liberty Records and sold 403,000 copies in its first week, The Chase debuted at number one on the Billboard 200 chart and Top Country Albums chart and has been certified diamond by the RIAA. It was also successful internationally, reaching number one on the UK country albums chart and remained in the top ten for many months.

"Dixie Chicken" is a cover of the classic Little Feat song off of their 1973 album of the same name, while "Night Rider's Lament" is a classic cowboy song that had been previously recorded by Jerry Jeff Walker and Chris LeDoux.

Background
Brooks commented on the album, saying:

Commercial performance
The Chase debuted atop the U.S. Billboard 200, becoming his second, and number one on the Top Country Albums, becoming his third Country chart-topping album. This album was keeping Madonna's "Erotica" from taking the top spot. In 2020, The Chase was certified diamond by the RIAA.

Track listing

AThis track was not on the original release of the album. It first appeared when the album was re-released as part of Brooks' first Limited Series box set collection, and has since been part of subsequent releases of the album.

Personnel

Musicians

 Bruce Bouton – pedal steel guitar on "Somewhere Other Than the Night", "Mr. Right", "Walk-in' After Midnight", "Dixie Chicken", "Learning to Live Again", "That Summer" and "Night Rider's Lament"
 Garth Brooks – lead vocals; backing vocals on "Every Now and Then" and "Night Rider's Lament"
 Mark Casstevens – acoustic guitar
 Gary Chapman – backing vocals on "We Shall Be Free"
 Mike Chapman – bass guitar
 Johnny Cobb – backing vocals on "We Shall Be Free"
 Charles Cochran – string arrangements on "Somewhere Other Than the Night" and "Learning to Live Again"
 Rob Hajacos – fiddle on "Mr. Right", "Walkin' After Midnight", "Dixie Chicken", "Night Rider's Lament" and "Face to Face"
 Vicki Hampton – backing vocals on "We Shall Be Free" and "Dixie Chicken"
 Yvonne Hodges – backing vocals on "We Shall Be Free" and "Dixie Chicken"
 Chris Leuzinger – electric guitar
 Donna McElroy – backing vocals on "We Shall Be Free" and "Dixie Chicken"
 Debbie Nims – backing vocals on "We Shall Be Free"
 Denis Solee – clarinet on "Dixie Chicken"
 Milton Sledge – drums, percussion
 Howard Smith – backing vocals on "We Shall Be Free"
 Bobby Wood – keyboards; piano on "Mr. Right", "Walkin' After Midnight" and "Dixie Chicken"
 Trisha Yearwood – backing vocals on "Dixie Chicken", "That Summer" and "Night Rider's Lament"
 Nashville String Machine – string section on "Somewhere Other Than the Night" and "Learning to Live Again"

Production
 Allen Reynolds – producer 
 Mark Miller – recording and mixing engineer
 Matt Allen – recording assistant 
 Richard Aspinwall – recording and mix assistant 
 Terry Palmer – recording assistant, technical supervisor 
 Carlos Grier – digital editing 
 Denny Purcell – mastering engineer

Charts

Weekly charts

Year-end charts

Decade-end charts

Singles

Other charted songs

Certifications

References

 
1992 albums 
Albums produced by Allen Reynolds
Garth Brooks albums
Liberty Records albums